The  is a compact MPV produced by Honda. It was first introduced in the Chinese market in September 2013, where it is manufactured by Dongfeng Honda. It is based on the ninth-generation Civic platform and has two seating versions for 5 or 4+2 passengers.

Market
The Jade was developed primarily with the Chinese market in mind but has since been released in Japan from February 2015 and parts of Asia such as Hong Kong, and in Singapore. Due to declining sales, it was withdrawn from the Singapore market in May 2018.

Besides the two seating options (5 or 4+2), there are two trim levels (EXi or VTi), and two transmissions (5AT or CVT) and two engines to choose from (1.8L upon release, followed by 1.5L Turbo).

Versions 
In February 2015, a hybrid version went on sale in Japan with a 2+2+2 seating layout.

In May 2015, the Jade RS was launched to the Japanese market, offering a newly developed 1.5-liter direct injection VTEC Turbo engine rated at 150 PS (148 hp) at 5,500 rpm and 203 N⋅m (150 lb-ft) of torque between 1,600 and 5,000 rpm.

Facelift 
The facelifted Jade was unveiled at the 2016 Auto Guangzhou. The Japanese domestic market version of the facelifted Jade was launched on 17 May 2018, and went on sale on the following day. It was announced on the website on 8 March 2018. The trim levels are G, RS, X, HYBRID RS and HYBRID X, which were equipped with standard Honda Sensing. The Jade was discontinued in China in June 2020 and Japan on 31 July 2020, alongside the Civic sedan and the City, known as the Grace in the latter, due to declining sales of these models.

Gallery 
Chinese market

Japanese market

References

External links 

Jade
Cars introduced in 2013
2020s cars
Compact MPVs
Front-wheel-drive vehicles
All-wheel-drive vehicles
Vehicles with CVT transmission